Khana Baraha is a Bengali historical drama film directed by Bijoy Bose and produced by Ashim Sarkar. This film was based the story of Manmatha Roy on the life of Khana and Varāhamihira, the ancient mathematician astrologers of India. It was released on 29 May 1981.

Plot
Baraha is an astrologer and member of emperor Vikramaditya's Navaratnas. He abandoned his new born son in the sea. The baby reaches the coast of Singhal and grows up as Mihir with miraculous astrological knowledge. He marry Khana, another talented lady poet. Now They come to India to search Mihir's parents.

Cast
 Uttam Kumar as Baraha
 Sandhya Roy as Khana
 Santu Mukhopadhyay as Mihir
 Ruma Guha Thakurta as Baraha's Wife
 Samit Bhanja as Kamandak
 Gyanesh Mukherjee as Bhairav
 Mrinal Mukherjee
 Asit Baran as King Vikramaditya
 Shekhar Chatterjee as Dharmadhikar
 Biplab Chatterjee as Tilak
 Alpana Goswami

References

1981 films
Films scored by Shyamal Mitra
Bengali-language Indian films
Indian drama films
1980s Bengali-language films
1981 drama films